This is an alphabetical list of all populated places, including cities, towns and villages, in the Tibet Autonomous Region of western China.

A

Alamdo
Alhar
Arza
Asog

B

Baga
Bagar
Baidi
Baima
Baimai
Baixoi
Bamda
Banag
Banbar
Banggaidoi
Bangkor
Bangru
Bangxing
Baqên
Bar
Bêba
Bei
Bênqungdo
Bilung
Birba
Biru
Bogkamba
Boindoi
Bolo
Bongba
Boqê
Bumgyê
Bungona’og
Bünsum
Burang
Bushêngcaka

C

Caina
Cakaxiang
Camco
Cawarong
Cazê
Cêgnê
Cêngdo
Cêri
Cêrwai
Chabug
Chacang
Chagla
Chagna
Chagyoi
Cha’gyüngoinba
Chalükong
Chamco
Chamda
Chamoling
Changgo
Changlung
Changmar
Charing
Chatang
Chawola
Chêcang
Chênggo
Chepzi
Chibma
Chido
Chigu
Chongkü
Chongsar
Chowa
Chubalung
Chubarong
Chuka
Chumba
Chumbu
Chunduixiang
Co Nyi
Cocholung
Codoi
Cogo
Coka
Comai
Cona (Tsona)
Co’nga
Congdü
Conggo
Coqên
Coyang
Cuoma
Cuozheqiangma

D

Dagdong
Dagmo
Dagri
Dagring
Dagzhuka
Dakyung
Damdoi
Damnyain
Dangquka
Damxoi
Daba (Danbab)
Dangqên
Daqên
Dartang
Darzhuo
Dawatang
Dawaxung
Dayêr
Dêgên
Dêgyi
Dêlêg
Dêmqog
Dênggar
Dêngzê
Dêqên
Dêrdoin
Dêrtang
Dêrub
Dêxing
Digna
Dingchog
Dinggo
Dinggyê
Diyag
Doba
Dobê
Dobjoi
Dobqên
Dobzha
Do’gyaling
Doijiang
Dolma Sampa
Domar
Domartang
Dombang
Dongbo
Dongco
Donggar
Dongjug
Dongngoin
Dongqiao
Dongxê
Doqemo
Doxoggu
Doxong
Dungro
Dunxu
Duomula
Düri
Dzānak

E

Êmagang

F

Fosung

G

Gadong
Gala
Gambaxoi
Gamqen
Gamtog
Gana
Ganda
Gandaingoin
Gangga
Gaqoi
Garbiutangka
Garbo
Garo
Gardê
Gariqiong
Garma
Garong
Garxincun
Garyarsa (Gartok)
Gase
Gatang
Gêding
Gêgar
 Gejizhen
Gêla
Gohaling
Goibo
Goicang
Goicangdoi
Goicangmai
Goin’gyibug
Goinsargoin
Golag
Golingka
Golug
Gomo
Gongtang
Gongqên
Gormain
Gorqu
Gotang (Kungtang)
Gowaqungo
Goxung
Goyü
Güncang
Günlu
Günsa
Günsang
Gur
Gurabnamgyai
Gurum
Gyaca
Gyaco
Gya'gya
Gyamco
Gyamda
Gyamotang
Gyamug
Gyanbê
Gyangkar
Gyangngog
Gyangrang
Gyantse
Gya'nyima
Gyarab
Gyari
Gyarubtang
Gyaxing
Gyazhug
Gyêmdong
Gyêrba
Gyêwa
Gyibug
Gyigang
Gyigyi
Gyimda
Gyimda
Gyinkar
Gyipug
Gyiru
Gyitang
Gyonub
Gyorxung
Gyungcang

H

Hongqi
Hongxing
Hormai
Horru
Huangtiandi
Huo'er (Hor)

I

Isaikalog

J

Jagbung
Jaggang
Jagka
Jagsamka
Jainzhug
Jangco
Jangdam
Jangmai
Jêdêxoi
Jênlung
Jiangda (Jamda)
Jiaqiong (Jongnag)
Jiazha
Jiggyob
Jomda
Jongnê
Jorra
Jungba
Jungsi

K

Kada
Kagor
Kaika
Kaimar
Kaimar
Kamru
Kamsa
Kanglung
Kangmar
Kangrai
Kangro
Kangsê
Kangtog
Kangxung
Kardag
Kardoi
Kargang
Karmai
Karmardo
Karrêg
Karsumdo
Kata
Kazixiang
Kenze Māne
Kormang
Korqên
Korqug
Küba
Kugka Lhai
Kunggar
Kunglung
Kurqên
Kyangngoin
Kyêrdo
Kyunglung

L

Ladoi
Laiyor
Laka
Lamado
Langgar
Langju
Langmai
Langmar
Langna
Lanngazhoinkang
Lazhuglung
Lêba
Lêgzê
Leten
Lhabu
Lha’gyai
Lhainag
Lhai’u’gyü
Lhajam
Lhari
Lhasa
Lhasoi
Lhato
Lhatog
Lhazê
Lhazhong
Lhoma
Lhomar
Lhorong
Lhünzê
Lhünzhub (Gandainqonkor) 
Lhunzhub Nongchang
Lingka
Lingqu
Lingti
Lingza
Logtang
Lopu
Lugu
Lumachomo
Lumaringbo
Lunang
Lungdo
Lunggar
Lungmar
Lungsang
Lungzhong
Lura

M

Mabja
Macala
Mainacun
Mainda
Maindong
Maindu
Mainkung
Mainpu
Maiyü
Malilang
Mamba
Mamta
Mangra
Mani
Maoniupo
Maqên
Mar (Marqu)
Mardêng
Margyang
Markam
Marmê
Marri
Mêdog
Mêdogdêng
Mêmo
Mentang
Midika
Moincêr
Momo’ngar
Mugarripug
Mükangsar

N

Nagarzê
Nagjog
Nagqu
Nailung
Naixi
Naiyü
Naizha
Nala’nga
Namco
Namgyaigang
Namgyaixoi
Namka
Namling
Namoding
Namoqê
Namru
Nangxian
Napug
Naqên
Narüdo
Nayag
Nêdong
Ngamda
Ngamringxoi
Ngangca
Nganggug
Ngarnang
Ngarzhag
Ngiangri
Ngomdo
Ngoqudoima
Ngoqumaima
Ngükang
Ngüxoi
Noh
Norbukyungzê
Norcang
Nordê
Norma
Nujiang
Numari
Nyaimai
Nyainrong
Nyangbo
Nyangri
Nyêmo
Nyêru
Nyêtang
Nyêwo
Nyigê
Nyima
Nyingchi
Nyingda
Nyingzhong
Nyixung
Nyizhê
Nyogzê
Nyugku

O

Oibab
Oiga
Oiyug
Oma
Ombu
Orma

P

Padain
Paggai
Paggor
Pagnag (Pana)
Pagri
Painbo Nongchang
Paingar
Par
Parco
Parding
Parling
Parlung Zangbo
Pana
Parta
Paryang
Pazhug
Pêlung
Pêxung
Poindo
Poinsog
Pompain
Pongda
Porgyang
Pubu
Pula
Püncogling
Punzom
Puqu
Purgadala

Q

Qabgar
Qabnag
Qagbasêrag
Qagcaka
Qagzê
Qainaqangma
Qajortêbu
Qamdo
Qamdün
Qamqênxoi
Qangba
Qangdoi
Qangmai
Qangzê
Qarasa
Qayü
Qêqên
Qêri
Qiangma 
Qigêgyizhungma
Qinglung
Qingtü
Qizhong
Qoi
Qoidêkong
Qoidên
Qomo
Qonggyaixoi
Qugaryartang
Qugcang
Qugcodoi
Qujang
Qulho
Qumdo
Qumig
Qumigxung
Qunaggai
Qungdo’gyang
Qungtag
Quntamari
Qu’nyido
Qu’og
Qusum
Quxam

R

Rabang
Rabgyailing
Rabka
Rabqên
Racaka
Ragxi
Raixarma
Raka
Ramai
Ramba
Rangzhub
Rawu
Rayü
Ribxi
Ridung
Rigong
Rila
Rimar
Rinbung
Rindü
Ringtor
Rinqênzê
Risong
Risum
Ritang
Rixoi
Ro’gyog
Rolagang
Rongbo
Rongma
Rongmê
Rongpu Si
Rongqu
Rongxar
Rongxar
Rubba
Rusar
Rutog

S

Sa’gyari
Sa’ngain
Sadêng
Sadengmucun
Saga
Sagang
Sagyaxoi
Sainca
Saiqu
Samai
Samaixung
Samarda
Sambriāl
Samcang
Samka
Samsang
Samyai
Sanagda
Sancam
Sangba
Sangdê
Sanglai
Sangmenzhang
Sangnag Choling
Sangri
Sangsang
Sangxung
Sanor
Sapügang
Sar
Sato
Sêbrong
Sêlêpug
Sênco
Sêndo
Sêngdo
Sêngdoi
Sênggêkanbab
Sêrca
Sêrdê
Sêrkang
Sêrlung
Seronggang
Sêrtang
Sêwa
Sewu
Shangzayü
Shela
Shelkar
Shigatse
Shiquanhe (Sênggê)
Shürong
Sima
Sinda
Sogba
Sogdoi
Sogma
Sogmai
Sogxung
Soila
Sokai
Sumxi
Sumzom
Surco

T

Taglung
Taizhao
Taktsang
Talu
Tamze
Tangdê
Tanggar
Tanggo
Tanggyai
Tanglhai
Tangluqangma
Tangmai
Targyailing
Tarmar
Têbo
Têmarxung
Têmo
Têring
Tiangacun
Tingri
Tirkang
Toba
Tobgyai
Togqên
Toinqu
Toling
Tomra
Tongpu
Toudaoban
Tuglung
Tuma
Tungdor
Tunggar
Tungru

U

Urdoi
Urmai
Uxu

V

Valuxai

W

Wangda
Wangdain
Wangdian
Wangkar
Woinbodol
Wüjang
Wulang
Wumatang

X

Xabyai
Xaga
Xagar
Xagjang
Xagnag
Xago
Xagquka
Xainza
Xalazakung
Xangzha
Xardong
Xarlung
Xarma
Xaxa
Xayag
Xênkyêr
Xêxung
Xia Lingka
Xiazayü
Xiayanjingxiang
Xingba
Xinrong
Xiongmei
Xobando
Xognga
Xoi
Xoisar
Xoka
Xongmai
Xümo
Xungba
Xungqên
Xungru

Y

Yadong
Yagra
Yaiba
Yamo
Ya’ngamdo
Yangbajain
Yanhu
Yanshiping
Yardoi
Yarong
Yarzhong
Yêndum
Yi’ong
Yubzha
Yudo
Yümai
Yumco

Z

Zaindainxoi
Zaisang
Zala
Zamar
Za’ngoza’ngoin
Zangqênrong
Zangxoi
Zapug
Zaqog
Zaragoy
Zari
Zaxoi
Zayul 
Zêba
Zêsum
Zhabdün
Zhabsang
Zhainzê
Zhamo
Zhangdong
Zhangmu
Zharen
Zhasa
Zhaxigang
Zhaxizê
Zhêxam
Zhigung
ZhongLingka
Zhongzê
Zhowagoin
Zhugla
Zhuglung
Zhujia
Zigar
Zingqi
Zito
Zoco
Zongga
Zongxoi

References

 Wu Zhenhua (武振华), Xizang Diming (西藏地名; Place Names in Tibet), Chinese Tibetology Press (中国藏学出版社) 1996, 

Tibet
Tibet Autonomous Region
Towns